John W. Olsen, Ph.D., is an American archaeologist and paleoanthropologist specializing in the early Stone Age prehistory and Pleistocene paleoecology of eastern Eurasia.  Olsen is Regents' Professor Emeritus of Anthropology and Executive Director of the Je Tsongkhapa Endowment for Central and Inner Asian Archaeology at the University of Arizona in Tucson, Arizona, USA.  He is also a Lead Scientific Researcher at the Institute of Archaeology and Ethnography of the Russian Academy of Sciences' Siberian Branch (Ведущий научный сотрудник, Институт археологии и этнографии CO PAH) in Novosibirsk and Guest Research Fellow at the Chinese Academy of Sciences' Institute of Vertebrate Paleontology and Paleoanthropology (IVPP; 中国科学院古脊椎动物与古人类研究所客座研究员) in Beijing where he is also Co-Director of the Zhoukoudian International Paleoanthropological Research Center (周口店国际古人类研究中心联席主任).  Olsen has been named a Distinguished Researcher of the Nihewan Research Center in Hebei Province, China (泥河湾研究中心特聘研究员).  He is also a Foreign Expert affiliated with The Yak Museum in Lhasa, Tibet (西藏牦牛博物馆国外专家).

Olsen's role as Co-Director of the Joint Mongolian-Russian-American Archaeological Expeditions (Монгол-Орос-Америкийн Археологийн Хамтарсан Экспедици, Хамтран захирал; Российско-Монгольско-Американская Совместная Археологическая Экспедиция, Cодиректор) has been the nexus of his research activities since 1995, even as the Expedition's geographical focus has expanded to include Xinjiang (beginning in 2004) and Tibet (especially the Gangdise-Nyenchen Tanglha sub-ranges of the Trans-Himalaya System, beginning in 2006) as well as other ethnic Mongol and ethnic Tibetan territories in Russia and the independent Central Asian republics of the former USSR.

Olsen's research emphasizes the Paleolithic archaeology of arid lands and high elevations in Central and Inner Asia, especially that area formerly referred to as "Haute-Asie" that encompasses Mongolia and Tibet.  His interests include Quaternary paleoecology and the impact of environmental degradation on prehistoric societies; cultural ecology and environmental archaeology with emphasis on zooarchaeology, especially animal husbandry among pastoral and nomadic societies; and spatial analysis in archaeology, including applications of remote sensing and geographic information systems. Olsen has conducted collaborative archaeological fieldwork in the United States (Florida & Arizona), Colombia, Belize, the Philippines, Egypt, Sudan, the People's Republic of China (Tibet, Qinghai, Xinjiang, Inner Mongolia, Hebei, Shanxi, Shaanxi, Gansu, & Ningxia), Việt Nam, Kazakhstan, Uzbekistan, Turkmenistan, Russia (Siberia), and Mongolia (Mongol Uls).  As of 2021, he has been director or co-director of 21 interdisciplinary archaeological field expeditions.

Early life and education
John Olsen was born in Concord, Massachusetts, the only offspring of Stanley John Olsen (1919–2003; vertebrate paleontologist and zooarchaeologist) and Eleanor Louise Vinez Olsen (1917–2016; executive assistant, botanist and homemaker).

Olsen spent his formative years in Tallahassee, Florida where he lived until he moved to Tucson, Arizona with his parents in 1973.
Following his early graduation from Florida High School in Tallahassee after completing the eleventh grade, Olsen attended Florida State University as a freshman (1972–1973) and subsequently received Bachelor of Arts degrees with Highest Distinction and Honors in Anthropology and Oriental Studies from the University of Arizona (1976).  Olsen holds Master of Arts (1977) and Doctor of Philosophy (1980) degrees in Anthropology from the University of California, Berkeley where his principal academic advisors were Glynn Ll. Isaac (dissertation chair), J. Desmond Clark, F. Clark Howell, and William A. Clemens, Jr.

Career
After completing his doctoral degree at Berkeley in 1980, Olsen was appointed visiting assistant professor in the Departments of Anthropology and Oriental Studies at the University of Arizona, where he taught until 1982.  From 1982 to 1984, Olsen was a post-doctoral research associate of the Institute of Archaeology at University College, London where he taught courses, planned and carried out research expeditions in China and North Africa, and translated and co-edited a book on Chinese paleoanthropology published by Academic Press in 1985.

Olsen joined the permanent faculty of the University of Arizona as an assistant professor of Anthropology in 1984.  He was promoted to associate professor with tenure in 1988 and to full professor in 1994.  In 2005, Olsen was awarded a Regents' Professorship.

Olsen retired from teaching at the University of Arizona in 2016 to accept research positions with the Chinese and Russian Academies of Sciences.

In 1991–1992 Olsen held a Fulbright Research and Lecturing Award at Kazakh State University (now Al-Farabi Kazakh National University; Əл Фараби атындағы Қазақ Ұлттық Университеті) in Almaty. Olsen's administrative appointments have included Resident Representative in Beijing for the U.S. National Academy of Sciences (1990–1991) and Head of the Department (now School) of Anthropology at the University of Arizona (1994–1995 and 1998–2008).

Over the past three decades, Olsen has accrued slightly more than US$1.9 million in sponsored support of his and his students' research as well as spearheading successful development and fundraising activities on behalf of the University of Arizona's School of Anthropology.

Principal awards, honorary degrees, and elected memberships
 Phi Beta Kappa Society (1976)
 Phi Kappa Phi (1976)
 Fellow, The Explorers Club (1982)
 Academician, Mongolian Academy of Humanitarian Sciences (Академич, Монголын ХУА) (1998)
 Doctoris Archaeologiae Honoris Causa, Mongolian Academy of Sciences (Археологийн шинжлэх ухааны хүндэт доктор, Монголын ШУА) (2003)
 Regents' Professor, University of Arizona (2005)
 Regents' Professor Emeritus, University of Arizona (2016)
 Doctoris Archaeologiae Honoris Causa, Institute of Archaeology and Ethnography, Siberian Branch, Russian Academy of Sciences (Почетный доктор археологических наук, Института археологии и этнографии, СО РAH) (2020).  See: Юбилейное заседание Учёного совета ИАЭТ СО РАН (4:53:10 to 5:32:14)

Selected publications
 1985 (edited with Wu, Rukang) Palaeoanthropology and Palaeolithic Archaeology in the People's Republic of China. Orlando: Academic Press.  .
 1990 (with R. L. Ciochon and J. James) Other Origins, the Search for the Giant Ape in Human Prehistory.  New York: Bantam Books. .
 2000 (edited with A. P. Derevianko and D. Tseveendorj) Archaeological Studies Carried Out by the Joint Russian-Mongolian-American Expedition in Mongolia in 1997 & 1998. Novosibirsk: Institute of Archaeology and Ethnography, Russian Academy of Sciences, Siberian Branch. .
 2002 (with A. P. Derevianko, A. N. Zenin, V. T. Petrin, and D. Tseveendorj) Kamenn'i Vek Mongolii:  Paleoliticheskie Kompleksi' Kremnevoi Dolin', Gobiskii Altai (Stone Age of Mongolia: Paleolithic Assemblages from Flint Valley, Gobi Altai).  Novosibirsk: Institute of Archaeology and Ethnography, Siberian Branch, Russian Academy of Sciences. .
 2008 (with A. P. Derevianko, D. Tseveendorj, S. A. Gladyshev, T. I. Nokhrina, and A. V. Tabarev) "Novoe Prochtenie Arkheologicheskogo Konteksta Peshcher' Chikhen" (Mongolia) ("New Insights into the Archaeological Record at Chikhen Agui Rockshelter"), Arkheologiya, Etnografiya, i Antropologiya Evrazii 2(34): 2–12.
 2010  (with D. Rhode, Ma Haizhou, D. B. Madsen, P. J. Brantingham and S. L. Forman) “Paleoenvironmental and Archaeological Investigations at Qinghai Lake, Western China: Geomorphic and Chronometric Evidence of Lake Level History,” Quaternary International 218: 29–44.
 2012  (with S. A. Gladyshev, A. V. Tabarev and A. J. T. Jull) “The Upper Paleolithic of Mongolia: Recent Finds and New Perspectives,” Quaternary International 281: 36–46.
 2013  (with B. Gunchinsuren) “The Upper Paleolithic of Mongolia and Northwest China,” in Basic Issues in Archaeology, Anthropology, and Ethnography of Eurasia, Festschrift on the Occasion of Anatoly Derevianko’s 70th Birthday, edited by V. I. Molodin and M. V. Shunkov, pp. 182–193.  Novosibirsk: Institute of Archaeology and Ethnography, Siberian Branch, Russian Academy of Sciences Press.  (In English and Russian).
 2015  (with A. M. Hudson, J. Quade, T. E. Huth, Lei Guoliang, H. Cheng, R. L. Edwards and Zhang Hucai) “Lake-level Reconstruction for 12.8–2.3 ka of the Ngangla Ring Tso Closed-Basin Lake System, Southwest Tibetan Plateau,” Quaternary Research 83: 66–79.
 2015  (with Liye Xie, S. L. Kuhn, G. P. Sun, Y. F. Zheng, P. Ding and Y. Zhao) “Labor Costs for Prehistoric Earthwork Construction: Experimental and Archaeological Insights from the Lower Yangzi Basin, China,” American Antiquity 80(1): 67–88.
 2016  (with C. Perreault, M. T. Boulanger, A. M. Hudson, D. Rhode, D. B. Madsen, M. L. Steffen, J. Quade, M. D. Glascock and P. J. Brantingham) “Characterization of Obsidian from the Tibetan Plateau by XRF and NAA,” Journal of Archaeological Science: Reports 5: 392–399.
 2016  (with A. M. Hudson, J. Quade, Lei Guoliang, T. E. Huth and Zhang Hucai) “A Regional Record of Expanded Holocene Wetlands and Prehistoric Human Occupation from Paleowetland Deposits of the Western Yarlung Tsangpo valley, southern Tibetan Plateau,” Quaternary Research 86: 13–33.
 2017  (edited with Junko Habu and Peter V. Lape) Handbook of East and Southeast Asian Archaeology.  New York: Springer-Verlag.   (eBook ).
 2017  (with A. M. Khatsenovich, E. P. Rybin, B. Gunchinsuren, R. A. Shelepaev, L. V. Zotkina, Ts. Bolorbat, A. Y. Popov and D. Odsuren) “New Evidence for Paleolithic Human Behavior in Mongolia: the Kharganyn Gol 5 Site,” Quaternary International 442: 78–94.

References

External links
 John W. Olsen – School of Anthropology, University of Arizona
 PaleoMongolia, Joint Mongolian-Russian-American Archaeological Expeditions
 Institute of Archaeology and Ethnography, Russian Academy of Sciences, Siberian Branch
 Institute of Vertebrate Paleontology and Paleoanthropology, Chinese Academy of Sciences
 The Yak Museum, Lhasa, Tibet

Living people
American archaeologists
University of Arizona faculty
Tibetologists
Mongolists
Explorers of Central Asia
Explorers of Tibet
Explorers of China
People from Concord, Massachusetts
Florida State University alumni
University of Arizona alumni
University of California, Berkeley alumni
Year of birth missing (living people)